K.T. Sankaran (born 25 December 1954) was a judge of the Kerala High Court. The  High Court of Kerala  is the highest court in the Indian state of Kerala and in the Union Territory of Lakshadweep. The High Court of Kerala is headquartered at Ernakulam, Kochi.

Early life
He was born in Thalakkasseri, near Pattambi, Palakkad, Kerala on 25 December 1954. He completed his education from S.B.S Thanneercode, Government High School, Kumaranellur, St. Thomas College, Thrissur and Sree Krishna College, Guruvayoor, Saraswathy Law College, Mercara, Coorg, Karnataka. He enrolled as an Advocate in 1979.

Career
He started practice in Magistrate Court Pattambi in 1979 and shifted his practice to Kerala High Court in 1982. On 2 February 2005, he was appointed as an additional judge of Kerala High Court and became a permanent judge on 22 November 2006. He retired from  service 
upon attaining superannuation on 25/12/2016.

References

Judges of the Kerala High Court
1954 births
Living people
People from Palakkad district